"Lift" is a single by American DJ Sean Tyas. It was released by Discover Records as a digital download on September 24, 2006.

It has received support from the top DJs:
The original mix was chosen by Armin van Buuren to be the Tune of the Week in the 256 episode of A State of Trance, and was played by him a few months later on Armin Only 2006, later released on DVD. It also appeared on Trancemaster 5003.
The Sean Tyas rework was featured on the Copenhagen: Elements of Life World Tour DVD/Blu-ray by Tiësto.

A new version of the Sean Tyas rework, as well as 7 new remixes were released in the end of 2011.

Track listing 
Lift (2006)
 "Lift (Original mix)" - 8:25
 "Lift (Sean Tyas rework)" - 8:25
 "Lift (Bryan Kearney edit)" - 8:25

Lift (2011)
 "Lift (Sean Tyas Live rework)" - 8:29
 "Lift (Thomas Datt remix)" - 7:14
 "Lift (Estigma remix)" - 7:49
 "Lift (Matt Skyer remix)" - 7:44

Lift Part 2 (remixes) (2011)
 "Lift (Lisa Lashes remix)" - 6:33
 "Lift (Sly One vs Jurrane remix)" - 7:02
 "Lift (Des McMahon remix)" - 8:00
 "Lift (Darren Porter remix)" - 6:58

Release History

References 

2006 singles
2011 singles
2006 songs